The 2007–08 Memphis Grizzlies season was their 13th season in the National Basketball Association and seventh in Memphis. The Memphis Grizzlies failed to qualify for the Playoffs for the second straight season. They finished 14th in the Western Conference with an awful record of 22-60, being only marginally better than the 20-62 Seattle SuperSonics.

In February, Pau Gasol was traded to the Los Angeles Lakers for his younger brother, Marc who would play the following season.

Key dates prior to the start of the season:

The 2007 NBA draft took place in New York City on June 28.
The free agency period begins in July.

Draft picks

Roster

Standings

Record vs. opponents

Game log

October 
Record: 0–1; Home: 0–1; Road: 0–0

November 
Record: 5–9; Home: 3–3; Road: 2–6

December 
Record: 3–12; Home: 2–7; Road: 1–5

January 
Record: 5–11; Home: 4–5; Road: 1–6

February 
Record: 1–11; Home: 1–4; Road: 0–7

March 
Record: 5–11; Home: 3–4; Road: 2–7

April 
Record: 3–5; Home: 1–3; Road: 2–2

Green background indicates win.
Red background indicates loss.

Player stats

*Total for entire season including previous team(s)

Awards and records

Awards
Juan Carlos Navarro, NBA All-Rookie Team 2nd Team

Records

Milestones

Transactions
On July 27, the Memphis Grizzlies signed unrestricted free agent Darko Miličić. This is the third team Darko has played for in the past 4 years.

The Grizzlies biggest transaction this season has been trading their All Star center, Pau Gasol to the Los Angeles Lakers. The trade gave the Lakers some strength in the front court and gave the Grizzlies some draft picks and prospects and it opened up room in their Salary Cap

Trades
On February 1, 2008, the struggling Memphis Grizzlies, traded away their All-Star center Pau Gasol and a future second round draft pick to the Los Angeles Lakers, for center Kwame Brown, rookie point guard Javaris Crittenton, Aaron Mckie, the draft rights to Pau's brother, Marc Gasol, along with two future first round draft picks. It's been the first time ever in league history that a player has been traded for their brother.

Free agents

See also
2007–08 NBA season

References

Memphis Grizzlies seasons
Memphis
Memphis Grizzlies
Memphis Grizzlies
Events in Memphis, Tennessee